Rialto Pictures is a film distributor founded in 1997 by Bruce Goldstein. A year later, Adrienne Halpern joined him as partner. In 2002, Eric Di Bernardo became the company’s National Sales Director. It was described as “the gold standard of reissue distributors” by Los Angeles Times/NPR film critic Kenneth Turan. In 1999, Rialto received a special Heritage Award from the National Society of Film Critics, and in 2000 received a special award from the New York Film Critic’s Circle, presented to Goldstein and Halpern by Jeanne Moreau. The two co-presidents have each received the French Order of Chevalier of Arts and Letters.

During the past decade, Rialto Pictures has become one of the great names in film distribution. In 2002, the company released the critically acclaimed first-run film Murderous Maids, the chilling true story of two homicidal sisters, starring Sylvie Testud. Rialto celebrated a record-breaking 2004 with the previously unreleased, original 1954 Japanese version of Ishiro Honda’s Godzilla; Peter Davis’s Oscar-winning and newly restored 1974 documentary Hearts and Minds; and Gillo Pontecorvo’s groundbreaking The Battle of Algiers, one of 2004’s top-grossing foreign films. Rialto’s re-release of Alberto Lattuada’s Mafioso, a dark comedy from 1962 starring Alberto Sordi, was the unqualified highlight of the 2006 New York Film Festival. One of Rialto’s 2008 releases was Max Ophüls' legendary film Lola Montès in a definitive new 35mm restoration, which was showcased to enormous acclaim at Cannes Film Festival and Telluride Film Festival and was the spotlight retrospective of the 2008 New York Film Festival. In 2009, Rialto undertook the very first U.S. release of Jean-Luc Godard's Made in U.S.A., which could not be previously released due to rights issues, and also re-released Costa-Gavras' Academy Award-winning thriller Z. Most recently, the San Francisco International Film Festival presented Goldstein with its prestigious Mel Novikoff Award.

In 2006, the company released Jean-Pierre Melville’s 1969 Army of Shadows, never before shown in the U.S.; it was named the Best Foreign Film of the Year by both the Los Angeles Film Critics Circle and the New York Film Critics Circle. Since 2012, Rialto has been the main U.S. theatrical and non-theatrical representative of the Studiocanal library of 6,500 international titles.

2007 marked Rialto’s tenth anniversary, a milestone that was celebrated with a retrospective at the Museum of Modern Art in New York. Similar tributes were held at George Eastman House, in Rochester, New York; the AFI Silver Theater in Washington, D.C.; and the SIFF Theater in Seattle. In honor of the company's anniversary, The Criterion Collection has issued a special gift box set containing ten films displaying the breadth of Rialto's collection, including Army of Shadows, Au Hasard Balthazar, Band of Outsiders, Billy Liar, Discreet Charm of the Bourgeoisie, Mafioso, Murderous Maids, Rififi, The Third Man and Touchez pas au grisbi. The DVD box set was released under the name "Ten Years of Rialto Pictures" on October 28, 2008.

Rialto Pictures also handles North American distribution for most of the back catalog of French film production and distribution company StudioCanal, including titles from the company's Embassy Pictures and Carolco Pictures libraries.

Selected releases
Army of Shadows
Band of Outsiders
The Battle of Algiers
Le Cercle Rouge
Contempt
Diary of a Chambermaid
Django
Le Doulos
Elevator to the Gallows
Fanfan la Tulipe
Godzilla
The Graduate
Grand Illusion
It Always Rains on Sunday
Last Year at Marienbad
Lola Montès
Made in U.S.A.
Mafioso
Masculine Feminine
Nights of Cabiria
That Obscure Object of Desire
Peeping Tom
The Producers
Rififi
Touchez pas au grisbi
Two or Three Things I Know About Her
A Woman Is a Woman
Z

References

External links
Rialto Pictures official website
Rialto Pictures at the Internet Movie Database 

Film distributors of the United States